Sing Me the Songs That Say I Love You: A Concert for Kate McGarrigle is a 2012 documentary film directed by Lian Lunson. It follows a memorial concert on May 12, 2011 at Town Hall in New York City had been made to pay tribute to musician Kate McGarrigle, who died from sarcoma at the age of 63 in 2010. The concert was headlined by Kate's children Martha and Rufus Wainwright, while also featuring her sisters Jane and Anna McGarrigle, comedian Jimmy Fallon, and musicians Emmylou Harris, Norah Jones, Antony and Teddy Thompson. The compilation album Sing Me the Songs: Celebrating the Works of Kate McGarrigle serves as the film's soundtrack.

Reception
The review aggregation website Rotten Tomatoes reported a 43% approval rating with an average rating of 5.5/10/10 based on 7 reviews. Metacritic assigned a score of 61 out of 100, based on 5 critics, indicating "generally favorable reviews".

References

External links
 

2012 documentary films
2012 films
Concert films
Documentary films about music and musicians
Films directed by Lian Lunson
Films shot in New York City
Kate & Anna McGarrigle
2010s English-language films